This is a list of British television related events from 1956.

Events

January
No events.

February
17 February – The Midlands becomes the first part of the UK outside London to receive ITV, when ATV Midlands begins broadcasting their weekday franchise. The weekend franchise, ABC, appears a day later.

March
28 March – Television transmissions begin from the new Crystal Palace site in south London

April
28 April – John Ford's western film Stagecoach (1939), starring John Wayne, debuts on BBC TV. The film is shown again on 24 December as part of BBC TV's Christmas line-up.

May
3 May – Granada Television begins broadcasting, extending ITV's coverage to Northern England, but starts broadcasting across Yorkshire (part of Granada's region until 1968) only in late Autumn. ABC's weekend franchise begins two days later.
10 May – British TV debut of Gunsmoke as Gun Law, on ITV. The TV programme will have a 20 year run on ITV before moving to other channels.

June
No events.

July
6 July – Hancock's Half Hour debuts on the BBC Television.
8 July – The anthology drama series Armchair Theatre, produced by ABC Weekend TV for the ITV network, begins its run (until 1974).

August
No events.

September
15 September – The Adventures of Sir Lancelot debuts on ITV. After being sold to the NBC network in the United States, it later becomes the first British television series ever to be made in colour. It premieres in the United States on 24 September.

October
31 October – On popular BBC television talk show Free Speech, an especially bitter debate on the Suez Crisis takes place, with leftist historian A. J. P. Taylor and Labour journalist and future party leader Michael Foot calling their fellow-panellist, Conservative MP Robert Boothby, a "criminal" for supporting the war.

November
No events.

December
25 December – Christmas Day highlights include the British TV debut of The Lone Ranger on BBC TV.

Unknown
Trade test colour films are broadcast on BBC Television for the first time

Debuts

BBC Television Service/BBC TV
8 January – Space School (1956)
12 January –  Strictly T-T (1956)
21 January – Tales from Soho (1956)
31 January – The Frontiers of Science (1956–1960; 1968–1969)
5 February – The White Falcon (1956)
21 February – Nathaniel Titlark  (1956)
24 February – Jane Eyre (1956)
8 March – Men in Battle (1956–1957)
10 March – My Friend Charles (1956)
29 March – Billy Cotton Band Show (1956–1968)
5 April – Double Cross (1956)
6 April – Diving To Adventure (1956)
10 April – Picture Parade (1956–1962)
15 April – Rex Milligan (1956)
21 April – Opportunity Murder  (1956)
7 May – The Adventures of the Big Man (1956)
24 May – Eurovision Song Contest (1956–present) 
4 July – Abigail and Roger (1956)
6 July – Hancock's Half Hour (1956–1961)
21 August – The Black Tulip (1956)
25 August – Bill Radford: Reporter (1956)
28 September – David Copperfield (1956)
4 October – Whack-O! (1956–1960, 1971–1972)
6 October – Potts in Parovia (1956)
20 October – The Other Man (1956)
28 October 
 Kidnapped (1956)
 The Recording Angells (1956)
10 November – Evans Abode (1956)
13 November – The Watch Tower (1956)
1 December – 
The Norman Wisdom Show (1956)
The Crime of the Century (1956)
25 December – The Lone Ranger (1949–1957)
28 December – Vanity Fair (1956–1957)
Unknown – Champion the Wonder Horse (1956–1957)

ITV
6 January – This Week (1956–1978, 1986–1992)
16 February – Alfred Marks Time (1956–1961)
20 February – The Count of Monte Cristo (1956)
2 March – I'm Not Bothered (1956)
27 April – The Tony Hancock Show (1956–1957)
2 May – A Show Called Fred (1956)
10 May – Gunsmoke (1955–1975)
11 May – My Sister and I (1956)
9 June – Those Kids (1956)
20 June – Opportunity Knocks (1956–1978, 1987–1990)
8 July – Armchair Theatre (1956–1974)
20 July – My Husband and I (1956)
31 July – The Crimson Ramblers (1956)
15 September – The Strange World of Planet X (1956)
15 September – The Adventures of Sir Lancelot (1956–1957)
17 September – 
The Adventures of Aggie (1956–1957)
Son of Fred (1956)
18 September – My Wife's Sister (1956)
19 September – The Buccaneers (1956–1957)
20 September – Over to William  (1956)
21 September – Assignment Foreign Legion (1956)
3 November –  Dr. Jekyll and Mr. Hyde (1956)
5 November – What the Papers Say (1956–2008)
 1 December – The Errol Flynn Theatre (1956–1957)
 15 December – The Trollenberg Terror (1956)
 24 December – Boyd Q.C. (1956–1964)
 31 December – Cool for Cats (1956–1961)
Unknown – 
Spot the Tune (1956–1962)
Highway Patrol (1956–1960)
Zoo Time (1956–1968)

Television shows

1920s
BBC Wimbledon (1927–1939, 1946–2019, 2021–2024)

1930s
The Boat Race (1938–1939, 1946–2019)
BBC Cricket (1939, 1946–1999, 2020–2024)

1940s
Come Dancing (1949–1998)

1950s
Andy Pandy (1950–1970, 2002–2005)
What's My Line? (1951–1963)
Flower Pot Men (1952–1958, 2001–2002)
Watch with Mother (1952–1975)
The Appleyards (1952–1957)
All Your Own (1952–1961)
Rag, Tag and Bobtail (1953–1965)
The Good Old Days (1953–1983)
Panorama (1953–present)
The Grove Family (1954–1957)
Zoo Quest (1954–1963) 
The Woodentops (1955–1958)
The Adventures of Robin Hood (1955–1960)
Picture Book (1955–1965)
Sunday Night at the London Palladium (1955–1967, 1973–1974)
Take Your Pick! (1955–1968, 1992–1998)
Double Your Money (1955–1968)
Dixon of Dock Green (1955–1976)
Crackerjack (1955–1984, 2020–present)

Ending this year
Fabian of the Yard (1954–1956)

Births
 6 January – Angus Deayton, actor and television presenter
 9 January – Imelda Staunton, actress
 25 January – Bill Turnbull, television presenter (died 2022)
 8 February – Richard Sharp, banker and Chairman of the BBC
 14 February – Tom Watt, radio presenter, journalist and actor
 11 March – Helen Rollason, sports journalist and television presenter (died 1999)
 19 April – Sue Barker, tennis player and television presenter
 20 April – Georgie Glen, Scottish actress
 26 April – Koo Stark, actress
 13 May – Richard Madeley, television presenter
 28 May – Julie Peasgood, actress, author and television presenter
 1 June – Louise Plowright, actress (died 2016)
 10 October – Amanda Burton, actress
 30 October – Juliet Stevenson, actress
 28 November – Lucy Gutteridge, actress
 7 December – Anna Soubry, television journalist, barrister and politician

See also
 1956 in British music
 1956 in the United Kingdom
 List of British films of 1956

References